This list of museums in Hampshire, England contains museums which are defined for this context as institutions (including nonprofit organisations, government entities, and private businesses) that collect and care for objects of cultural, artistic, scientific, or historical interest and make their collections or related exhibits available for public viewing. Also included are non-profit art galleries and university art galleries.  Museums that exist only in cyberspace (i.e., virtual museums) are not included.

Defunct museums
 Eastleigh Museum, Eastleigh  closed in 2022. 
 The Bear Museum, Petersfield, closed in 2006
 God's House Tower Museum Of Archaeology, Southampton, closed in 2011
 Ringwood Town & Country Experience, Ringwood, closed indefinitely
 The Wool House, closed in 2012

See also
 :Category:Tourist attractions in Hampshire

References

Hampshire Museums Service

 
Hampshire
Museums